Beating the Game is a 1921 American silent crime film directed by Victor Schertzinger and starring Tom Moore, Hazel Daly and DeWitt Jennings.

The film's sets were designed by the art director Cedric Gibbons.

Cast
 Tom Moore as 'Fancy Charlie' 
 Hazel Daly as Nellie Brown 
 DeWitt Jennings as G.B. Lawson 
 Richard Rosson as Ben Fanchette 
 Nick Cogley as 'Slipper' Jones 
 Tom Ricketts as Jules Fanchette 
 Lydia Knott as Madame Fanchette 
 William Orlamond as Bank President 
 Lydia Yeamans Titus as Angelica - the Bank President's Wife

References

Bibliography
 James Robert Parish & Michael R. Pitts. Film directors: a guide to their American films. Scarecrow Press, 1974.

External links
 

1921 films
1921 crime films
1920s English-language films
American silent feature films
American crime films
Films directed by Victor Schertzinger
American black-and-white films
Goldwyn Pictures films
1920s American films